Zheng Chuanqi (born 8 March 1984) is a Chinese rower. He competed in the men's eight event at the 2008 Summer Olympics.

References

1984 births
Living people
Chinese male rowers
Olympic rowers of China
Rowers at the 2008 Summer Olympics
Rowers from Anhui
Rowers at the 2006 Asian Games
Asian Games competitors for China
20th-century Chinese people
21st-century Chinese people